Rye railway station or Rye station may also refer to:

 Rye railway station (East Sussex), in Rye, East Sussex, England
 Rye station (Metro-North), in Rye, New York, United States
 Rye railway station (Rye and Camber Tramway), a former station in Rye, East Sussex, England

See also 
 Peckham Rye railway station in London, England.
 Rye House railway station in Rye House, Hertfordshire, England